Radhamonal Naval (26 January 1981 – 14 April 2002) was an Indian actress who appeared in Tamil language films. She was the younger sister of actress Simran and appeared in notable productions including Badri (2001) alongside Vijay. She died by suicide in 2002.

Early life

Monal was born as Radhamonal Naval to parents Ashok Naval and Saratha in Delhi. She did her schooling in Delhi and college in Bombay and studied for the Bachelor of Commerce degree in Mithibai College. She had two sisters, Simran and Jyothi, and a brother, Sumith.

Career

She did some modelling, fashion shows and beauty contests and subsequently received film offers. Monal's sister Simran was a leading actress in Indian films during the period, while another sister Jyoti made her debut in 2003. She was signed to make her debut in Badri alongside Vijay but her first release was Paarvai Ondre Pothume alongside Kunal (the actor of Kadhalar Dhinam).

Naval appeared in a few more films, with most turning out to be moderate successes at the box office. At the time of the death, she was working on Dadagiri, a Telugu film which featured her opposite Suman, and Best of Luck, a Tamil film co-starring Eashwar and Yugendran. 
On the day of her death, she had attended the launch of her new film Paiye Janmam, literally translating into "Ghost Life".

Death

She committed suicide, and was found hanging on 14 April 2002, aged just 21, in her room in Chennai. Her sister Simran in May 2002 accused choreographer, Prasanna Sujit, as a possible reason for her suicide claiming that Prasanna had broke off his relationship with her just days earlier.

Filmography

References

External links
 

Indian film actresses
Actresses in Tamil cinema
2002 deaths
1982 births
Actresses from Delhi
Actresses in Kannada cinema
Actresses in Telugu cinema
21st-century Indian actresses
Actresses in Hindi cinema
2002 suicides
Suicides by hanging in India
Artists who committed suicide
Female suicides